Estádio Juscelino Kubitschek de Oliveira was a multi-use stadium in Belo Horizonte, Brazil. It was initially used as the stadium of Cruzeiro Esporte Clube matches.  It was replaced by Estádio Independência in 1950.  The capacity of the stadium was 15,000 spectators.

References
 Stadium history

Defunct football venues in Brazil